This is a survey of the postage stamps and postal history of Afghanistan.

First stamps

The first stamps appeared in 1871. They were round in shape, imperforate, and printed in black, with a crude lion's head, surrounded by Arabic script specifying one of three denominations. The lion, sher, represented the head of state, Sher Ali Khan, as he had been named for the bravery of a lion. Many catalogues and early collectors incorrectly referred to these as "tiger" heads.  Cancellation was accomplished by cutting or tearing off a piece of the stamp. Cancellation by postmark was not introduced until 1891.  Initially somewhat large, subsequent issues kept the same basic design but were smaller each year, with the last appearing in 1878.  Starting in 1876, the stamps were printed in different colors, each color corresponding to one of the main post offices on the Peshawar-Kabul-Khulm route. Each design in a sheet was individually engraved, so the stamps vary considerably in appearance. Many of the Sher Ali issues are readily available, while some sell for hundreds of US$.

The defeat of Sher Ali by the British brought Abdur Rahman Khan to the throne in 1880, and the following year brought new stamps, still round, but with inscriptions in the middle instead of the lion's head.  The era of round designs ended in 1891 with rectangular issues for the "Kingdom of Afghanistan". The three designs consisted entirely Arabic script, and were printed in a slate blue color. The 1892 issue featured the national seal consisting of a mosque gate and crossed cannons; it was printed in black on colored paper; at least 10 colors of paper were used, and there are many shades as well, even though all the colors had the same value. In 1894 simplified versions of this design were printed on green paper. The 1898 issues of the national seal on a variety of colored paper were not regularly issued.

In 1907 the first rouletted stamps were issued, along with imperforate varieties, depicting a whole mosque, with various surrounding ornamentation. In the 1909 issue the mosque was displayed inside an eight-pointed star pattern.

Independence

The first issue after independence came out on 24 August 1920, a design featuring the royal star of King Amanullah.  The three denominations were also the first to use Latin script for the numerals as well as Arabic. Beginning in 1924, each year at least one stamp was issued in February to commemorate independence, a pattern that held steady, with few omissions, until the 1960s.

Afghanistan joined the Universal Postal Union in 1928; previously international mail required stamps of British India. In 1927, the first Roman letters had appeared on an Afghan stamp, the inscription reading "AFGHAN POSTAGE".  This changed to the French "POSTES AFGHANES" in 1928, and remained in that form (with some deviations, as in the 1939 issue) until 1989.

The Afghan stamps of the 1930s and 1940s are rather plain affairs, mostly typographed, with large blank spaces in the design. The definitive series of 1951 was finely engraved by Waterlow and Sons, several featuring portraits of Mohammed Zahir Shah.

A large number of Afghan stamps appeared in the 1960s. Since the Afghan Postal Authority issued some stamps well below the minimal amount of postage, this was considered to be a scheme for making money from stamp collectors. The issues from 1960 on are not especially notable. During this time, a number of politically aligned stamps were produced demonstrating support for Pashtunistan, a political issue that cut relations with Pakistan for several years that decade.

Starting in the mid-1980s, many of the issues were clearly produced to sell to Western stamp collectors; for instance, the ship series of 1986 is not especially relevant in a landlocked country.

Civil war and after
The disruption of governance in the late 80s and early 90s due to civil war and the rise of the Islamic Emirate of Afghanistan, led to stopping of stamp issues from 1989 to 2001, although the postal service continued to exist it functioned only haphazardly using existing stamp supplies. There are only a few postal items known from the 1996 to 2001 period.  During this interim period, many unofficial stamps were printed and distributed, which were disavowed by the Afghanistan postal service in 2000 under the Taliban, and subsequently in 2003 by the Karzai government.  Stamp production resumed when the Taliban regime was overthrown and the Afghan Postal Authority reconstituted.
The first issue of a postage stamp after the hiatus was the May 2002 stamp showing Ahmad Shah Massoud, a military general and national hero who defended Afghanistan against the Soviet Union in the 1980s and later led a resistance movement against the Taliban.

See also
Afghan Post
Communications in Afghanistan
List of people on stamps of Afghanistan
Postal codes in Afghanistan
Postal history

References and sources
Notes and references

Sources
 
 Stanley Gibbons Ltd: various catalogues
 
 Stuart Rossiter & John Flower: The Stamp Atlas
 F. E. Patterson III, Afghanistan: Its Twentieth Century Postal Issues The Collectors Club, 1964
 Cecil H. Uyehara and Horst G. Dietrich, "Afghan Philately 1871-1989" George Alevizos, Santa Monica, CA USA, 1995
 John M. Wilkins RFD, "Afghanistan 1840-2002 Postal History Handbook, Revised Edition", The Royal Philatelic Society of Victoria (Australia), 2002.
 Wilkins and Divall, "Afghanistan Revisted, Postal Stationery-Revenues-Forgeries", The Royal Philatelic Society of Victoria (Australia), 2005.
 Robert Jack, "The Revenue Stamps and Printed Paper of Afghanistan", Robert Jack, 2009

Further reading
 Masson, Sir David Parkes & B. Gordon Jones. The Postage Stamps of Afghanistan. Madras: Higinbotham & Co., for the Philatelic Society of India, 1908. (From notes originally prepared by Gilbert Harrison.)

External links
 Stamp issuers - Afghanistan on stampsofdistinction.com
 Stamps and postal history of Afghanistan a comprehensive site about the early issues

Philately of Afghanistan
Postage stamps of Afghanistan